The Charlottetown Abbies were a Junior "A" team based in Charlottetown, Prince Edward Island. They played in the Maritime Junior Hockey League. Their home rink from 2003 to 2008 was the MacLauchlan Arena on the campus of UPEI. Before then, it was the Charlottetown Civic Centre (now Eastlink Centre).

History
In 1972, the Charlottetown Abbies were a Midget Hockey program with little competition.  They applied for entry into the Island Junior Hockey League in 1972.  The IJHL turned down their application on the basis that they were too weak for Junior B competition.  The Abbies, undeterred, applied for entry into the Southeast New Brunswick Junior B Hockey League instead.  The New Brunswick league allowed the Abbies to join and after a slow start the Abbies ended up finishing second in the regular season (to the Dieppe Voyageurs) and winning the league playoffs.  To win the playoffs, the Abbies defeated the Bouctouche Seals 3-games-to-none (9-3, 9–3, forfeit) in the Semi-final and then defeated the Memramcook Legionnaires 3-games-to-none (8-1, 10–2, forfeit) in the League Final.  The Abbies then failed to qualify for the 5-team New Brunswick provincial championship round robin because they lost the Southeast New Brunswick qualifier to the independent Moncton Flyers 2-games-to-none (4-3, 3-1).  In 1973, the IJHL was promoted to Junior A and the Abbies were granted expansion into the league.

The Abbies were an institution in Junior hockey in Charlottetown for several decades. In the 70s the Island Junior Hockey League (IJHL) boasted two Charlottetown teams, the Generals who played in the old Charlottetown Forum, and the Abbies who were based at the Simmons Sports Centre. The league also included at one time or another the Kings County Kings, Summerside Crystals (Summerside Western Capitals), West Prince Bluefins, North River North Stars, and the Sherwood-Parkdale Metros.  Eventually the two Charlottetown teams merged, maintaining the Abbies moniker. As costs became prohibitive for an Island wide league at the Junior A level in the late 80s, teams in the league folded. Eventually, in 1991 the Abbies and the Summerside Western Capitals left to join teams in Nova Scotia and New Brunswick to form the Maritime Junior Hockey League.

In May 2008, it was announced that the Abbies' management had applied for a year's leave of absence from the Maritime Junior Hockey League, citing financial problems. The team almost relocated to Lewiston, Maine when the Lewiston Maineiacs (QMJHL) tried to relocate to Boisbriand, Quebec.

In May 2009, the commissioner of the MHL stated in a newspaper interview that the Abbies would not operate again.  On June 4, 2009, CBC reported the folding of the Abbies franchise.  The end of the Charlottetown Abbies meant that, for the first time since 1972, the City of Charlottetown did not have a Junior A team.

Logos
The Abbies have had many versions of the same logo until the 2007–08 season when they switched to their current script logo.

Season-by-season record

National playdowns
1978
Charlottetown Eagles defeated Cole Harbour Colts (MVJHL) 4-games-to-none in Eastern Centennial Cup Semi-final
Guelph Platers (OPJHL) defeated Charlottetown Eagles 4-games-to-2 in Eastern Centennial Cup Final

1985
Cole Harbour Colts (MVJHL) defeated Charlottetown Eagles 4-games-to-2 in Callaghan Cup Final

1987
Dartmouth Fuel Kids (MVJHL) defeated Charlottetown Abbies 4-games-to-1 in Callaghan Cup Final

1990
Charlottetown Abbies defeated Avalon Jr. Capitals (SJJHL) in Callaghan Cup Semi-final
Amherst Ramblers (MVJHL) defeated Charlottetown Abbies 4-games-to-1 in Callaghan Cup Final

1991
Halifax Canadians (MVJHL) defeated Charlottetown Abbies 4-games-to-none in Callaghan Cup Semi-final

1999
Charlottetown Abbies win Fred Page Cup
Defeated Hawkesbury Hawks (CJHL 6-3
Defeated Valleyfield Braves (QJAAAHL) 5-2
Defeated Antigonish Bulldogs (MJAHL)
Defeated Hawkesbury Hawks (CJHL) 2-0 in Finals
Charlottetown Abbies lost 1999 Royal Bank Cup Final
Lost to Yorkton Terriers (SJHL) 2-1
Defeated Vernon Vipers (BCHL) 6-5
Lost to Estevan Bruins (SJHL) 5-4
Defeated Bramalea Blues (OPJHL) 5-1
Defeated Yorkton Terriers (SJHL) 6-5 2OT in Semi-final
Lost to Vernon Vipers (BCHL) 9-3 in Final

2003
Charlottetown Abbies finish 4th at Fred Page Cup
Lost to Cornwall Colts (CJHL) 3-2
Lost to Nepean Raiders (CJHL) 3-1
Defeated Lennoxville Cougars (QJAAAHL) 7-5
Charlottetown Abbies finish 5th at 2003 Royal Bank Cup as hosts
Lost to Lennoxville Cougars (QJAAAHL) 5-4 2OT
Defeated Camrose Kodiaks (AJHL) 3-2
Lost to Wellington Dukes (OPJHL) 1-0 OT
Lost to Humboldt Broncos (SJHL) 8-5

Notable alumni
David Ling
Jason MacDonald
David Ambler (ice hockey)
William Hubloo

Colonels/Generals
The Charlottetown Generals were members of the Island Junior Hockey League in the 1970s.  They folded in the summer of 1977 after winning multiple league championships.  The Generals folded due to financial trouble.  The full name of the team was the Charlottetown Colonel Grays from their founding up until 1976 as they were affiliated with Colonel Gray High School in Charlottetown.

Season-by-season record

National playdowns
1974
Charlottetown Colonels defeated Moncton Hawks (NBJHL) 3-games-to-2 in Eastern Centennial Cup Quarter-final
Smiths Falls Bears (CJHL) defeated Charlottetown Colonels 4-games-to-1 in Eastern Centennial Cup Semi-final1975Gander Flyers (NJAHL) defeated Charlottetown Colonels 3-games-to-none in Atlantic Jr. A Final1976Charlottetown Colonels defeated St. John 77's (NBJHL) 4-games-to-2 in Eastern Centennial Cup Quarter-final
Charlottetown Colonels defeated Sydney Millionaires (EJHL) 4-games-to-1 in Eastern Centennial Cup Semi-final
Rockland Nationals (CJHL) defeated Charlottetown Colonels 4-games-to-none in Eastern Centennial Cup Final1977Charlottetown Generals defeated Sydney Millionaires (EJHL) in Eastern Centennial Cup Semi-final
Pembroke Lumber Kings (CJHL) defeated Charlottetown Generals 4-games-to-none in Eastern Centennial Cup Final

Notable alumni
Rick Vaive

Islanders
The Charlottetown Islanders were founded in 1968 to represent the province of Prince Edward Island in the Memorial Cup playoffs.  From 1968 until 1971, the Islanders played in the Maritime Junior A Hockey League.  In 1970, Major Junior A and Tier II Junior A were created from the Junior A classification and the Islanders and their league found themselves in the Tier II level playing for the Centennial Cup.  Their first year of Tier II saw them go deep and win the Eastern Canadian Championship in six games over the Detroit Jr. Red Wings of the Southern Ontario Junior A Hockey League, but lose the inaugural 1971 Centennial Cup 4-games-to-2 to the Alberta Junior Hockey League's Red Deer Rustlers.  In 1971, the MJAHL folded and the Islanders opted to play an independent schedule in instead of joining the neighbouring Junior A leagues in New Brunswick or Newfoundland.  For the 1971–72 season, the Islanders did not play a game until March 1972, playing a two-game exhibition series against the Hamilton Red Wings of the Ontario Major Junior Hockey League (2-2 Tie and 4-3 Win) and then jumping directly into National Playdowns as PEI's only representative.  In the playoffs, the Islanders dropped the Moncton Hawks of the New Brunswick Junior Hockey League 4-games-to-1 to advance to the Eastern Centennial Cup Final.  In the final, they faced the Guelph CMC's of the Southern Ontario Junior A Hockey League and were swept in four games.  The Islanders were disbanded prior to the start of the 1972–73 season.

Season-by-season record

National playdowns1970Charlottetown Islanders defeated Fredericton Chevies (NBJHL) 3-games-to-1 in Atlantic Jr. A Final
Charlottetown Islanders defeated Ottawa M&W Rangers (CJHL) 4-games-to-1 in Eastern Memorial Cup Quarter-final
Quebec Remparts (QMJHL) defeated Charlottetown Islanders 4-games-to-2 in Eastern Memorial Cup Semi-final1971Charlottetown Islanders defeated Moncton Hawks (NBJHL) 4-games-to-none in Eastern Centennial Cup Quarter-final
Charlottetown Islanders defeated Thunder Bay Marrs (TBJHL) 4-games-to-1 in Eastern Centennial Cup Semi-final
Charlottetown Islanders defeated Detroit Jr. Red Wings (SOJHL) 4-games-to-2 in Eastern Centennial Cup Final
Red Deer Rustlers (AJHL) defeated Charlottetown Islanders 4-games-to-2 in Centennial Cup Final1972Charlottetown Islanders defeated Moncton Hawks (NBJHL) 4-games-to-1 in Eastern Centennial Cup Semi-final
Guelph CMC's (SOJHL) defeated Charlottetown Islanders 4-games-to-none'' in Eastern Centennial Cup Final

Notable alumni
Kevin Devine
Hilliard Graves
John Hughes
Al MacAdam
Bob MacMillan

See also
List of ice hockey teams in Prince Edward Island

External links
Official Website

References

Maritime Junior Hockey League teams
Sport in Charlottetown
Ice hockey teams in Prince Edward Island
1972 establishments in Prince Edward Island
2008 disestablishments in Prince Edward Island
Ice hockey clubs established in 1972
Ice hockey clubs disestablished in 2008